NCSB may refer to:

North Carolina State Bar
National Centre for School Biotechnology
Netherlands Consortium for Systems Biology